The 1964 WCHA Men's Ice Hockey Tournament was the 5th conference playoff in league history. The tournament was played between March 12 and March 14, 1964. All games were played at home team campus sites. By reaching the title game both Denver and Michigan were invited to participate in the 1964 NCAA Men's Ice Hockey Tournament.

Format
The top four teams in the WCHA, based upon the conference regular season standings, were eligible for the tournament and were seeded No. 1 through No. 4. In the first round the first and fourth seeds and the second and third seeds were matched in two-game series where the school that scored the higher number of goals was declared the winner. The winners advanced to the title game which was to be played at the higher remaining seed's home venue. Due to the ongoing dispute between Minnesota and Denver the Golden Gophers refused to participate in the tournament and were replaced by 5th-place North Dakota.

Conference standings
Note: GP = Games played; W = Wins; L = Losses; T = Ties; PCT = Winning percentage; GF = Goals for; GA = Goals against

Bracket

Note: * denotes overtime period(s)

First round

(1) Michigan vs. (4) Michigan Tech

(2) Denver vs. (5) North Dakota

Final

(1) Michigan vs. (2) Denver

Tournament awards
None

See also
Western Collegiate Hockey Association men's champions

References

External links
WCHA.com
1963–64 WCHA Standings
1963–64 NCAA Standings
2013–14 Denver Pioneers Media Guide
2013–14 Michigan Wolverines Media Guide; Through the Years
2013–14 Minnesota Golden Gophers Media Guide 

WCHA Men's Ice Hockey Tournament
Wcha Men's Ice Hockey Tournament